Lebon Régis is a municipality in the state of Santa Catarina in the South region of Brazil. It was created in 1958 out of the existing municipality of Curitibanos.

See also
List of municipalities in Santa Catarina

References

Municipalities in Santa Catarina (state)